A hero is somebody who performs great and noble deeds of bravery.

Hero may also refer to:

People
 Hero of Alexandria (c. 10–70 AD), ancient Greek mathematician and engineer 
 Hero (given name), including a list of people with the given name
 Hero (singer) (Kim Jaejoong, born 1986), South Korean singer
 Justin Cassell (fl. 1950s), known as Hero, Montserratian calypso musician
 Oleg Penkovsky (1919–1963), codename Hero, Soviet double agent
 Hero of Byzantium, mid-10th century Byzantine author

Arts, entertainment and media

Fictional characters

 Protagonist, sometimes called hero, the main character in a story
 Hero, priestess of Aphrodite in the Greek myth of Hero and Leander
 and in Hero and Leander (poem) by Christopher Marlowe
 and in Hero and Leander (1819 poem) by Leigh Hunt 
 Hero, in the 1962 musical A Funny Thing Happened on the Way to the Forum
 Hero or Shen, in Dragon Ball
 Hero, the protagonists of the Dragon Quest series
 Hero (Much Ado About Nothing), in Shakespeare's Much Ado About Nothing
 Hero, a horse of comic character Phantom
 Hero, a name of comic book character the Forgotten One
 Hero, in video game Quest for Glory
 Captain Hero, in TV series Drawn Together
 Hero Brown, in comic book series Y: The Last Man
 Hero Cruz, a DC comics character
 HERO, a character in the 2020 role-playing video game OMORI

Film and television

Films
 Hero (1982 film), a British adventure-fantasy film
 Hero (1983 film), a Hindi romantic action film 
 Hero (1984 film), a Telugu film 
 Hero (1985 film), a Pakistani Urdu action-romance musical
 Hero (1987 film), a British documentary about the 1986 FIFA World Cup 
 Hero (1992 film), an American comedy drama 
 Hero (1997 film), a Hong Kong martial arts film 
 Hero (2000 film), an American short film 
 Hero (2002 film), a Chinese wuxia film
 Hero (2006 film), a Bengali-language action comedy
 Hero (2007 film), a Japanese film based on the TV series
 Hero (2008 film), a Telugu-language action comedy
 Hero (2012 film), a Malayalam-language action comedy thriller
 Hero (2015 Hindi film), a remake of the 1983 Hindi film
 Hero (2015 Japanese film), based on the TV series 
 Hero (2019 Tamil film), a superhero film 
 Hero (2019 Russian film), a spy action comedy
 Hero (2021 film), a Kannada-language action film
 Hero (2022 Indian film), a Telugu-language action film
 Hero (2022 Chinese film), a Chinese-language drama film
 Hero (2022 South Korean film), a Korean-language drama film
 Hero, an animated short film promoting the Overwatch game
 Hero – Beyond the Boundary of Time, a 1993 Hong Kong comedy film
 Hero: The Real Hero, a version of the 2007 Telugu film Desamuduru
 Hero: The Superstar, a 2014 Bangladeshi action comedy film

Television
 Hero (TV channel), a former pay TV channel in the Philippines
 Hero (2001 TV series), a Japanese drama
 Hero (2009 TV series), a South Korean action comedy
 Hero (2016 TV series), a Singaporean drama
 Hero - Bhakti Hi Shakti Hai, a 2005 Indian superhero series
 "Hero" (Angel), a 1999 episode
 "Hero" (Battlestar Galactica), a 2006 episode 
 "Hero" (Better Call Saul), a 2015 episode
 "Hero" (Sanctuary)", a 2009 episode
 "Hero" (Smallville), a 2008 episode
 "Hero" (The Unit), a 2009 episode

Gaming
 Hero (board game), 1980
 H.E.R.O. (video game), 1984 
 Hero Online, a 2006 online roleplaying game
 Hero System, a generic roleplaying game system published by Hero Games

Literature
 Hero (magazine), an American LGBT magazine 1997–2002
 Hero (British magazine), a men's fashion and lifestyle magazine from 2009
 Hero (novel), a 2007 novel by Perry Moore
 H.E.R.O. (comics), an American comic book series
 HERO, a graphic novel series by Yoshitaka Amano
 Hero Illustrated, a mid-1990s American comic book-themed magazine

Music

Albums
Hero (Bölzer album), 2016
Hero (Charlotte Perrelli album), 2008
Hero (Clarence Clemons album), 1985
Hero (Divinefire album), 2005
Hero (John Paul Young album), 1975
Hero (Kirk Franklin album), 2005
Hero (Maren Morris album), 2016
Hero (Super Junior album), 2013
Hero (van Canto album), 2008

Opera and musicals
 Hero (musical), a 1976 rock musical 
 !Hero, a 2003 rock opera

Songs
"Hero" (Afrojack and David Guetta song), 2021
"Hero" (Chad Kroeger song), 2002
"Hero" (Charlotte Perrelli song), 2008
"Hero" (David Crosby song), 1993
"Hero" (Enrique Iglesias song), 2001
"Hero" (Europe song), 2004
"Hero" (Family of the Year song), 2012
"Hero" (Mariah Carey song), 1993
"Hero" (Namie Amuro song), 2016
"Hero" (Nas song), 2008
"Hero" (Noah song), 2014
"Hero" (Skillet song), 2009
"Hero" (Weezer song), 2020
"Hero", by Bethany Dillon from Music Inspired by The Chronicles of Narnia: The Lion, the Witch and the Wardrobe
"Hero", by Cash Cash featuring Christina Perri from Blood, Sweat & 3 Years
"Hero", by Cassie Davis from Differently
"Hero", by Darren Hayes from The Tension and the Spark
"Hero", a 2002 song from the film by Faye Wong
"Hero", by Issues from Headspace (Issues album), 2016
"Hero", by James from The Night Before
"Hero", by Jars of Clay from The Long Fall Back to Earth, 2009
"Hero", by Jessie J from Kick-Ass 2 soundtrack
"Hero", by Kid Cudi and Skylar Grey from the Need for Speed film soundtrack
"Hero", by Linnéa Handberg Lund
"Hero", by Machinae Supremacy
"Hero", by Ministry
"Hero", by Monsta X
"Hero", by Neu! from Neu! '75
"Hero", by Nightrage from Sweet Vengeance
"Hero", by Ozzy Osbourne from No Rest for the Wicked
"Hero", by Regina Spektor from 500 Days of Summer
"Hero", by Royce da 5'9" from The Allegory
"Hero", by Sevendust from Next
"Hero", by Sterling Knight from Starstruck
"Hero", by Steve Taylor from Meltdown
"Hero", by Superchick from Last One Picked
"Hero", by The Verve Pipe from The Verve Pipe
"Hero", by Toni Braxton from the album Pulse
"Hero", by Zion I & The Grouch from Heroes in the City of Dope
"Hero", a version of "Wind Beneath My Wings" recorded by Gladys Knight & The Pips
"Hero/Heroine", a 2007 song by Boys Like Girls
"Hero (Kibō no Uta)" / "Cha-La Head-Cha-La", by Flow, 2013
"Hero / Sweet Jewel", by Fairies, 2011

Businesses and organisations
 Hero Certified Burgers, a Canadian restaurant chain
 Hero Motors Company, an Indian company group
 Hero Cycles, an Indian bicycle manufacturer
 Hero MotoCorp, formerly Hero Honda, an Indian motorcycle manufacturer
 Hero Motors, a former Indian moped and scooter manufacturer  
 Hero Group, a Swiss food company
 Hero (supermarket), a retail chain in Indonesia
 Hero Tires, a brand of Federal Corporation
 Shanghai Hero Pen Company, Chinese manufacturer of the Hero fountain pen
 Highway Emergency Response Operators, in Georgia, U.S.

Mythology
 Hero, the general concept
 Hero (Greece), the mortal offspring of a human and a god, or a man more than human but less than a god
 Hero, priestess of Aphrodite in the Greek myth of Hero and Leander
 Hero (son of Priam), one of the sons of king Priam

Science and technology
 Hero (gastropod), a genus in the family Heroidae
 HERO (robot), a series of 1980s educational robots
 HTC Hero, a smartphone 
 HERO camera series by GoPro
 High-Energy Replicated Optics, a high-altitude X-ray telescope
 Hyper extremely red objects, astronomical sources of radiation with extreme redshift

Transportation and military
 Hero (pinnace), a steam-powered boat, launched 1895
 Hero (1807 ship), a British whaler
 Hero (sloop), that explored the Antarctic in 1820
 Hero-class patrol vessels, nine ships of the Canadian Coast Guard
 RV Hero, an Antarctic research 1968–2017
 HMS Hero, several ships of the Royal Navy
 Hero, a South Devon Railway Dido class locomotive
 Hamilton-class cutter of the U.S. Coast Guard, some of which are known as "Hero class"
 Hero, loitering munition systems by UVision Air

Other uses
 Hero (title), a title presented by governments to their citizens for great achievements
 Hero, a roller coaster at Flamingo Land Resort in Yorkshire, England
 Hero (sandwich), a New York name for a submarine sandwich
 Higher Education and Research Opportunities in the UK, a former British website 
 Houston Equal Rights Ordinance, or 2015 Houston, Texas Proposition 1
 North Hero, Vermont, a town in the United States

See also

 Heroes (disambiguation)
 Heros (disambiguation) 
 Heroic (disambiguation)
 Heroine (disambiguation)
 Herro, given name and surname
 Herrö (disambiguation)
 Hiro (disambiguation)
 The Hero (disambiguation)
 The Heroes (disambiguation)
 Superhero (disambiguation) 
 Antihero
 Greek hero cult
 Hero's, a Japanese mixed martial arts promotion